Cha Cha de Amor is an album consisting of the last tracks recorded by Dean Martin for Capitol Records, released in 1962. After recording these sessions, Martin joined Frank Sinatra's Reprise Records label. This album's songs were recorded between December 18 and December 20 of 1961. Cha Cha de Amor was released on November 5, 1962 (see 1962 in music). The backing orchestra was conducted and arranged by Nelson Riddle. The album consists of twelve songs built upon an "authentic Afro-Cuban rhythm section."

Track listing

LP 
Capitol Records Catalog Number (S) T-1702 |

Side A 
 "Somebody Loves You" (Peter deRose, Charles Tobias) Time: – 2:34. Session 10427; Master 36948. Recorded December 20, 1961.
 "My One and Only Love" (Guy Wood, Robert Mellin) Time: – 2:29. Session 10419; Master 36921. Recorded December 19, 1961.
 "Love (Your Magic Spell Is Everywhere)" (Edmund Goulding, Elsie Janis) Time: – 2:25. Session 10417; Master 36853. Recorded December 18, 1961.
 "I Wish You Love" (Charles Trenet, Albert Askew Beach) Time: – 2:24. Session 10419; Master 36922. Recorded December 19, 1961.
 "Cha Cha Cha D'Amour (Melodie d'Amour)" (Leo Johns, Henri Salvador) Time: – 2:18. Session 10417; Master 36854. Recorded December 18, 1961.
 "A Hundred Years from Today" (Victor Young, Joseph Young, Ned Washington) Time: – 2:41. Session 10427; Master 36949. Recorded December 20, 1961.

Side B 
 "I Love You Much Too Much" (Don Raye, Alex Olshanetsky, Chaim Towber) Time: – 2:33. Session 10419; Master 36898. Recorded December 19, 1961.
 "(I Love You) For Sentimental Reasons" (William 'Pat' Best, Deek Watson) Time: – 2:21. Session 10427; Master 36947. Recorded December 20, 1961.
 "Let Me Love You Tonight" (René Touzet, Mitchell Parish) Time: – 2:21. Session 10419; Master 36899. Recorded December 20, 1961.
 "Amor" (Gabriel Ruíz, Sunny Skylar) Time: – 3:10. Session 10417; Master 36879. Recorded December 18, 1961.
 "Two Loves Have I" (Vincent Scotto, Georges Koger, Henri Eugene Vantard, Jack Murray, Barry Trivers) Time: – 2:09. Master 36887. Recorded December 18, 1961.
 "If Love Is Good To Me" (Fred Spielman, Redd Evans) Time: – 3:04. Session 10427; Master 36946. Recorded December 20, 1961.

Compact Disc 
1997 EMI/Capitol combined Cha Cha de Amor with Dino: Italian Love Songs (also from 1962). Catalog Number 7243 8 55393 2 9.

2005 Collectors' Choice Music reissue added four more tracks to the twelve tracks on the original Capitol LP. Catalog Number WWCCM06062.
 "Vieni Su (Say You Love Me, Too!)" (Johnny Cola) Time: – 2:40. Session 1451; Master 4874-5. Recorded March 3, 1950.
 "I Passed Your House Tonight" (Lew Spence, Don Raye) Session 2567; Master 9937-3. Time: – 2:56. Recorded April 8, 1952.
 "Wham! Bam! Thank You, Ma'am!" (Hank Penny) Time: – 2:49. Session 1870; Master 6469-4. Recorded July 31, 1950.
 "The Peddler's Serenade" (Jimmy Eaton, J.J. Corvo, Paul McGrane) Time: – 2:47. Session 1870; Master 6470-4. Recorded July 31, 1950.

Personnel 
 Dean Martin: Vocals
 Nelson Riddle: Leader
 Sol Klein: Contractor
 Alton R. 'Al' Hendrickson: Guitar (Sessions 10419 and 10427)
 Tony Reyes: Bass
 Fred O. Aguirre: Drums
 Carlos Mejia: Drums
 Ramon R. Rivera: Drums
 Edward 'Eddie' Cano: Piano
 Kermit 'Ken' Lane: Piano
 Victor Gottlieb: Cello (Session 10419)
 Armond Kaproff: Cello (Session 10419)
 Eleanor Aller Slatkin: Cello (Session 10419)
 Alvin Dinkin: Viola (Session 10419)
 Virginia Majewski: Viola (Session 10419)
 Barbara Simons: Viola (Session 10419)
 Victor Arno: Violin (Session 10419)
 Victor Bay: Violin (Session 10419)
 Alex Beller: Violin (Session 10419)
 David Frisina: Violin (Session 10419)
 James Getzoff: Violin (Session 10419)
 Ben 'Benny' Gill: Violin (Session 10419)
 Daniel 'Dan' Lube: Violin (Session 10419)
 Erno Neufeld: Violin (Session 10419)
 Nathan Ross: Violin (Session 10419)
 Felix Slatkin: Violin (Session 10419)
 Gene Cipriano: Saxophone (Sessions 10417 and 10427)
 Dale Issenhuth: Saxophone (Session 10417)
 Justin Gordon: Saxophone (Session 10427)
 Harry G. Klee: Saxophone
 Joseph J. Koch: Saxophone (Session 10417)
 Wilbur Schwartz: Saxophone (Sessions 10417 and 10427)
 Carroll Lewis: Trumpet (Sessions 10417 and 10427)
 Henry Miranda: Trumpet (Sessions 10417 and 10427)
 Al Rojo: Trumpet (Sessions 10417 and 10427)
 Clarence F. 'Shorty' Sherlock: Trumpet (Sessions 10417 and 10427)

Notes 

Dean Martin albums
1962 albums
Capitol Records albums
Albums produced by Dave Cavanaugh
Albums arranged by Nelson Riddle
EMI Records albums
Collectors' Choice Music albums
Albums conducted by Nelson Riddle